Bahar Kizil (Turkish: Bahar Kızıl; born 5 October 1988) is a German singer and songwriter of Turkish descent, best known as one of the founding members of the girl group Monrose, which won the fifth season of the German version of Popstars.

Early life 
Born in Freiburg, Baden-Württemberg, Kizil is from a Turkish family from Antalya, and her first name, Bahar, means "spring" (the season) in Turkish. At age 12, she started with ballet. In her town, she sang with four different bands prior to the Popstars casting.

Career
Kizil is one of the three winners of the fifth German Popstars season and was a member of the resulting group Monrose, together with Senna Gammour and Mandy Capristo. After their break-up in 2011, she started her solo-career in 2013 and premiered with her song "Drank" featuring SpaceBoyz. In the same year, her song "Medusa" featuring Nitro came out. In 2015, she released her debut album Bullets of Love, which did not peaked the Official Charts. In 2017, she participated on the German dance show Dance Dance Dance and teamed up with No Angels singer Sandy Mölling. 

After a long music break, Kizil came back in 2019 as an lead vocalist in the pop group Traumfrequenz. In the same year, she released her solo songs "What Eyes Cannot See" and "C'est ma vie". In 2020, she decided to sing in German and released the songs "Die Fremde", "Blaue Stunde", and "NOS" on YouTube and Spotify. She is currently working on her second album.

Discography

With Monrose

Studio albums

Compilation

Singles

As solo artist

With Traumfrequenz

Other appearances

Filmography

Television

References

1988 births
English-language singers from Germany
German pop singers
German people of Turkish descent
Living people
Monrose members
Musicians from Freiburg im Breisgau
21st-century German women singers